The Return is the debut studio album by Zambian born, Australian singer/songwriter Sampa the Great. It was released in September 2019 and peaked at number 12 on the ARIA Charts.

At the J Awards of 2019, the album was nominated for Australian Album of the Year.

In February 2020, the album won the Australian Music Prize 2019 and in doing so, Sampa the Great became the first musician to win the award twice.

At the AIR Awards of 2020, the album won Best Independent Hip Hop Album or EP. At the ARIA Music Awards of 2020, the album received four nominations, including ARIA Award for Album of the Year. Sampa the Great won Best Female Artist, Best Independent Release and Best Hip Hop Release for The Return. At the Music Victoria Awards of 2020, the album won Best Soul, Funk, R'n'B and Gospel Album and Best Album.

Reception

Paul Simpson from AllMusic said "The Return is the long-awaited debut album by rapper, songwriter, and poet Sampa the Great. The vast, ambitious full-length reflects several years of constant, intense soul-searching, and its songs and interludes revolve around themes of identity, homecoming, and self-empowerment." Simpson added "Though her music incorporates a wide variety of jazz, soul, and African influences, her dedication to hip-hop is never more apparent than on the victorious 'Final Form', a black power anthem with a strong, '9th Wonder'-inspired beat" calling the album "an impressive, powerful work."

Rachel Aroesti from The Guardian said "despite weaving southern African influences into the drumming and multilingual lyrics, Tembo's keen intellect and strong personality isn't always accompanied by the most distinctive sound. Highlight 'Final Form' channels Kanye West's brash take on classic soul and there is much busy but generic R&B on the bloated tracklist. Her vocal, meanwhile, can be offputtingly affected, resembling a parody of Kendrick Lamar's reedy, staccato flow. That said, Tembo is undoubtedly an intriguing addition to rap's increasingly rich tapestry – albeit one yet to land on a sonic palette as fresh and compelling as her perspective."

Madelyn Tait from The Music AU said "Drawing influence from hip hop, jazz, soul, R&B and southern African sounds, Sampa The Great has created something original, somewhat spiritual, and entirely authentic. She has remained at the forefront of the Australian hip hop scene for numerous years now, but with The Return, is destined for global acclaim."

Jack Doherty form Clash Music call the album "A bold post-genre record packed with inspired moments" adding "While there are times Sampa The Great leans hard into hip-hop's history, 'Time's Up' and Heaven', in particular, have a real 90s skate shop vibe about them [and] on the whole this record is overwhelming about the future, not the past. The beats often break away from standard rap shtick, taking the listener beyond genre and into the unknown."

Scott Hudson from Beat Magazine said "Sampa Tembo is a master of her craft but almost as importantly, she understands the value of collaboration. The Return is stacked with features from artists of African descent, Australian and abroad. Nineteen tracks is a lot to ask of any listener but Sampa's control of cadence paired with well-produced, well-performed instrumentals and choir sections, is enough for you to chronically listen to 'just one more'."

Track listing
 "Mwana" (feat. Mwanje Tembo, Theresa Mutale Tembo & Sunburnt Soul Choir) - 4:27
 "Freedom" - 4:06
 "Wake Up" (Interlude) - 0:54
 "Time's Up" (feat. Krown) - 2:33
 "Grass Is Greener" - 3:32
 "Dare to Fly" (feat. Ecca Vandal) - 4:23
 "Any Day" (feat. Whosane) - 4:17
 "OMG" - 2:34
 "Light It Up" (Interlude) - 2:15
 "Final Form" - 3:36
 "Heaven" (feat. Whosane) - 2:55
 "Diamond in the Ruff" (feat. Thando & Krown) - 4:54
 "Leading Us Home" - 4:05
 "Summer" (feat. Steam Down) - 4:24
 "Brand New (feat. SILENTJAY) - 3:48
 "Give Love" (Interlude) - 2:21
 "The Return" (feat. Thando, Jace XL, Alien & Whosane) - 9:17
 "Don't Give Up" (feat. Mandarin Dreams) - 7:04
 "Made Us Better" (feat. Blue Lab Beats, Boadi & Lori) - 6:20

Sample credits

 "Final Form" contains a sample of "Stay Away From Me" performed by the Sylvers and written by Leon Sylvers III.
 "Freedom" contains a sample of "Visions" performed by The Brief Encounter and written by Gary Bailey.
 "Diamonds In The Ruff" contains an interpolation "Son Of Pin Head" written by Katsunori Ishida
 "Heaven" contains a sample of "I‘m So Happy" performed by Light of the World and written by Peter Hinds, Ganiyu Bello, Everton McCalla, David John-Baptiste, Neville McKrieth, Canute Wellington, Nathaniel Augustin and Paul Williams.
 "Brand New" contains a sample of "You Make Me Feel Brand New" performed by Ron English and written by Thom Bell and
Linda Epstein.

Personnel

Adapted from the liner notes.

 Sampa the Great – vocals 
 Mwanje Tembo – vocals (tracks 1, 16), additional vocals (tracks 11-13, 17)
 Theresa Tembo – sampled voice (track 1)
 Perrin Moss – production (track 1), drums (tracks 1, 6, 18), bass (tracks 1, 6), synthesizer (track 1), guitar (tracks 1, 6), piano (track 18)
 Silentjay – production (tracks 2, 4-7, 9-15, 17-19), co-production (track 8), keyboards (tracks 4, 12), drum programming (tracks 4, 5, 9, 12, 13, 17), additional vocals (tracks 5, 17, 19), wurlitzer (track 5), organ (tracks 6, 12, 17), synth bass (track 6), rhodes (tracks 9, 13), clavinet (tracks 13, 17), roland juno (track 13), beatboxing (track 13), soprano saxophone (tracks 14, 18), string arrangements (track 17), bass (track 18), piano (track 19)
 Thando – additional vocals (track 2), vocals (tracks 12, 17)
 Syreneiscreamy – additional vocals (tracks 2, 17), production (track 16)
 Ecca Vandal – additional vocals (tracks 2, 17), vocals (track 6)
 Whosane – additional vocals (track 2), vocals (tracks 7, 11, 16, 17)
 Alejandro Abapo – additional vocals (track 2)
 Tebir – additional vocals (track 2)
 Jace XL – additional vocals (track 2), vocals (track 17)
 Sunburnt Soul Choir – additional vocals (track 2)
 Kumar Shome – guitar (tracks 4, 5, 12, 14, 16, 17), additional guitar (track 13)
 Alfrd – additional keyboards (track 4)
 Krown – vocals (tracks 4, 12)
 Kwes Darko – production (track 8)
 Alien – additional vocals (tracks 13, 17)
 Steam Down – guest band (track 14)
 Wayne Francis – horn arrangements (track 14), tenor saxophone (track 14)
 Charlotta Naima Adams – vocals (track 14)
 Dwayne Frederick Kilvington – bass (track 14)
 Ayo Salawu – drums (track 14)
 Lorenz Okello-Osengor – keyboards (track 14)
 Ike Ruckman – guitar (tracks 17, 18)
 Jimmy Bowman – wurlitzer (track 17), electric piano (track 18), trumpet (track 18), trombone (track 18)
 Simon Mavin – organ (track 17), rhodes (track 17), additional synthesizers (track 17), co-production (track 17)
 Kuzich – percussion (tracks 17, 18)
 Paul Bender – strings (track 17), string arrangements (track 17), co-production (track 17)
 Mandarin Dreams – guest band (track 18)
 Boadi – vocals (track 19)
 Lori – vocals (track 19) 
 Mr. DM – bass (track 19), guitar (track 19), additional keyboards (track 19), production (track 19)
 NK OK – drum programming (track 19), production (track 19)

Charts

Release history

References

2019 debut albums
ARIA Award-winning albums
Ninja Tune albums
Sampa the Great albums